Analyst is a biweekly peer-reviewed scientific journal covering all aspects of analytical chemistry, bioanalysis, and detection science. It is published by the Royal Society of Chemistry and the editor-in-chief is Norman Dovichi (University of Notre Dame). The journal was established in 1877 by the Society for Analytical Chemistry.

Abstracting and indexing
The journal is abstracted and indexed in MEDLINE and Analytical Abstracts. According to the Journal Citation Reports, the journal has a 2017 impact factor of 3.864.

Analytical Communications
In 1999, the Royal Society of Chemistry closed the journal Analytical Communications because it felt that the material submitted to that journal would be best included in a new communications section of Analyst. Predecessor journals of Analytical Communications were Proceedings of the Society for Analytical Chemistry, 1964–1974; Proceedings of the Analytical Division of the Chemical Society, 1975–1979; Analytical Proceedings, 1980–1993; Analytical Proceedings including Analytical Communications, 1994–1995.

References

External links

Chemistry journals
Analytical chemistry
Royal Society of Chemistry academic journals
Publications established in 1876
English-language journals
Biweekly journals
1876 establishments in the United Kingdom